This is a list of Nigerian musicians.

Only notable individuals are included here; for groups, see List of Nigerian musical groups. Names are to be arranged by the first letter of Wikipedia reference.

0–9

2face Idibia - hip hop and R&B singer
9ice - hip hop and afropop singer

A

A-Q - hip hop artist
Abiodun Koya (born 1980), gospel singer, opera singer
Ada Ehi  - Gospel Artiste and songwriter 
Adé Bantu - Nigerian-German musician, producer, front man of the 13 piece band BANTU
Adekunle Gold - singer, songwriter
Adewale Ayuba - fuji music singer
Ado Gwanja - hausa singer
Afrikan Boy - rapper
Afro Candy - pop singer
Alamu Atatalo - sekere singer, a type of traditional Yoruba music
 Ali Nuhu - Hausa singer and songwriter, Kannywood
Ali Jita - Hausa singer and song writer
Amarachi - singer, dancer, violinist
Andre Blaze - rapper
Aramide - Afro-Jazz singer
Ara - singer and talking drummer
Asuquomo - musician
Aṣa - R&B, country and pop singer-songwriter
Ayinde Bakare - Yoruba jùjú and highlife musician
Ayinla Kollington - Fuji musician
Ayinla Omowura - apala musician
Ayra Starr - Afropop & R&B singer

B

Babatunde Olatunji - drummer
Bella Shmurda
Banky W - pop and R&B singer-songwriter
Blackface Naija - reggae musician
Blackmagic - rapper, singer, songwriter
Blaqbonez - rapper
Brymo - singer
Burna Boy - reggae-dancehall musician

C

CDQ - rapper, songwriter
Celestine Ukwu - highlife musician
Chidinma - pop singer
Chike - singer, songwriter and actor
Chinko Ekun – rapper, songwriter
Charly Boy
Cobhams Asuquo - soul singer
Cynthia Morgan - pop, hip hop and dancehall singer

D

D'banj - pop singer
Daddy Showkey - Galala Singer
Da Emperor - indigenous rapper
Da Grin - rapper
Dammy Krane - singer, songwriter
Darey - R&B singer-songwriter
Dauda Epo-Akara - Yoruba musician
Davido - pop singer
Dekumzy - R&B and highlife singer 
Dele Ojo - juju music singer and performer 
Dice Ailes - pop singer
Di'Ja - singer
DJ AB - rapper, songwriter and record producer
DJ Lambo - singer
Don Jazzy - recording artist and record producer
D'Prince - Afro-pop singer
Dr Sir Warrior - Igbo highlife musician and performer
Dr. Alban - Nigerian-Swedish recording artist and producer 
Dr SID - pop singer
Duncan Mighty - reggae singer

E

Ebenezer Obey - jùjú musician
Echezonachukwu Nduka - pianist and musicologist
Eddy Wata - Eurodance singer
Eedris Abdulkareem
Ego Ogbaro
eLDee – rapper, singer, producer
Emeka Nwokedi – conductor and music director
Emma Nyra – R&B singer
Emmy Gee – rapper
Eva Alordiah-rapper and singer
Evi Edna Ogholi-Reggae singer

F

Falz - rapper, songwriter
Faze - R&B singer
Fela Kuti - afrobeat, jazz singer-songwriter and instrumentalist
Fela Sowande
Femi Kuti - afrobeat, jazz singer-songwriter and instrumentalist
Fireboy DML - singer
Flavour N'abania - highlife and hip hop singer
Frank Edwards – gospel singer

G

Genevieve Nnaji - pop singer
GoodGirl LA - singer

H

Helen Parker-Jayne Isibor - opera singer and composer
Harrysong - singer and songwriter
Haruna Ishola
Humblesmith - afropop singer

I

I.K. Dairo
Ice Prince - rapper
Idahams - Singer and song writer 
Iyanya - pop singer
Ikechukwu - Singer, rapper and actor

J

J. Martins - highlife singer-songwriter and record producer
Jamopyper - musician
Jaywon
Jesse Jagz - rapper
Jasën Blu - R&B singer-songwriter and record producer
Joeboy - singer
Joe El - singer
Johnny Drille - singer

K

K1 De Ultimate - Fuji musician
Kcee
Kefee - Gospel singer
Kida Kudz - Afropop singer
King Wadada - Reggae singer
Kizz Daniel
Koker
Korede Bello
Kheengz

L

Ladipoe
Lagbaja
Lara George
Laycon
Lil Kesh
Lyta

M

M.I - rapper 
M Trill - rapper
Made Kuti - afrobeat musician
Majek Fashek - singer-songwriter
May7ven
May D singer-songwriter 
Mayorkun Singer-songwriter
Maud Meyer - jazz singer
Mercy Chinwo - Gospel Artiste
Mike Ejeagha - Highlife musician
Miraboi -singer-songwriter 
Mo'Cheddah - hip hop singer
Mode 9 - rapper
Monica Ogah - pop singer-songwriter
Mr 2Kay
Mr Eazi - singer-songwriter
Mr Raw
Mr Real - house singer
Muma Gee - pop singer-songwriter
Muna - rapper

N

Naeto C
Naira Marley – singer and songwriter
Niniola - Afro-house artist
Niyola - soul and jazz singer
Nneka - hip hop and soul singer
Nonso Amadi
Nonso Bassey - Musician, actor and model
Nosa - gospel artist

O

Obongjayar - Singer
Obesere - fuji musician
Obiwon - R&B and gospel singer
Odumodu - rapper and hip hop artist
Olamide - rapper and hip hop artist
Oliver De Coque
Omawumi - soul singer
Omah Lay
Omotola Jalade Ekeinde – R&B and pop singer
Onyeka Onwenu - pop singer
Orezi - reggae singer
Oriental Brothers
Oritse Femi
Orits Williki - Reggae singer
Orlando Julius
Osita Osadebe
Orlando Owoh
Muraina Oyelami - dùndún and Batá drummer

P

Patience Ozokwor - highlife singer
Patoranking - reggae and dancehall singer
Paul Play Dairo - R&B Singer
Pepenazi - rapper, hip hop artist and record producer 
Pericoma Okoye 
Peruzzi 
Peter King 
Phyno - rapper and record producer 
Pheels - Singer and record producer 
Praiz - R&B singer and songwriter
Prettyboy D-O - Recording artist
Prince Nico Mbarga
PsychoYp - Rapper

R

Ras Kimono - Reggae artist
Reekado Banks - hip hop artist
Rema - Afrobeats and Trap
Reminisce - Rapper
Rex Lawson
Ric Hassani 
Ruby Gyang 
Ruger (singer)
Ruggedman - rapper and hip hop artist
Runtown - songwriter and hip hop artist

S

Sade Adu
Safin De Coque - rapper and hip hop artist
Saheed Osupa - Fuji musician
Salawa Abeni - Waka singer
Samsong - gospel singer
Sarz - Producer and musician
Sasha P - rapper and singer
Sean Tizzle - Afropop
Seun Kuti - afrobeat, Jazz singer-songwriter and instrumentalist
Seyi Shay - pop singer and songwriter
Slimcase (singer) - recording artist and singer
Shina Peters - juju singer
Simi
Sinach - gospel singer
Skales - rapper and singer
Shola Allynson - Gospel Singer
Small Doctor - afrobeat
Sonny Okosuns
Sound Sultan
Stella Damasus - R&B and soul singer
Sunny Ade - jùjú singer

T

Tamara Jones - R&B singer-songwriter
Tekno Miles - Afropop singer-songwriter and producer
Tems - singer
Teni - singer and songwriter
Terry G
The Cavemen - highlife band
Timaya - reggae singer
Tiwa Savage - R&B and pop singer-songwriter
Timi Dakolo - singer and winner of Idol West Africa (2007)
Toby Foyeh - guitarist
Tonto Dikeh - pop singer
Tony Allen
Tony Tetuila
Tonye Garrick - R&B singer-songwriter
Tope Alabi-gospel singer
Tunde King
Tunde Nightingale
TY Bello - gospel singer

V

Victor Olaiya - composer
Victor Uwaifo
Vict0ny - musician

W

Waconzy - pop singer
Waje 
Wasiu Alabi Pasuma - film actor and Fuji musician
Weird MC - rapper
William Onyeabor
Wizkid - pop singer
Wurld - Electro fusion

Y

Ycee - rapper
Yemi Alade- R&B and pop singer
Yinka Ayefele-gospel singer
Yinka Davies - jazz singer
Yung6ix - rapper
Yusuf Olatunji

Z

Zlatan – singer
Zayn Africa - R&B and pop singer-songwriter
Zoro African Rapper

See also

Music of Nigeria

References

 
Nigerian